Macon County is a county located in the U.S. state of Illinois. According to the 2010 United States Census, it had a population of 110,768. Its county seat is Decatur.

Macon County comprises the Decatur, IL Metropolitan Statistical Area.

History
Macon County was formed on January 19, 1829, out of Shelby County. It was named for Nathaniel Macon, a Colonel in the Revolutionary War. Macon later served as senator from North Carolina until his resignation in 1828. In 1830, future US President Abraham Lincoln and his family moved to Macon County.

Geography

Macon County is primarily flat, as is most of the state and all of the surrounding counties, the result of geological activity during the Pleistocene epoch. During the Illinoian Stage of the Pleistocene, the Laurentide Ice Sheet covered about 85 percent of Illinois, including the Macon County area. The subsequent thaw of the region and retreat of the ice sheet left central Illinois with its present characteristic flat topography.

Because of its central location, Macon County is often referred to as "The Heart of Illinois."

Climate and weather

Major highways

  Interstate 72
  U.S. Route 36
  U.S. Route 51
  Illinois Route 48
  Illinois Route 105
  Illinois Route 121
  Illinois Route 128

Transit
 Decatur Public Transit System
 List of intercity bus stops in Illinois

Adjacent counties

 De Witt - north
 Piatt - northeast
 Moultrie - southeast
 Shelby - south
 Christian - southwest
 Sangamon - west
 Logan - northwest

Demographics

As of the 2010 United States Census, there were 110,768 people, 45,855 households, and 29,326 families residing in the county. The racial makeup of the county was 79.3% white, 16.3% black or African American, 1.0% Asian, 0.2% American Indian, 0.7% from other races, and 2.5% from two or more races. Those of Hispanic or Latino origin made up 1.9% of the population. In terms of ancestry, 21.7% were German, 17.0% were American, 12.9% were Irish, and 10.8% were English.

Of the 45,855 households, 29.5% had children under the age of 18 living with them, 45.7% were married couples living together, 14.1% had a female householder with no husband present, 36.0% were non-families, and 30.9% of all households were made up of individuals. The average household size was 2.33 and the average family size was 2.89. The median age was 40.3 years.

The median income for a household in the county was $44,337 and the median income for a family was $57,570. Males had a median income of $48,570 versus $31,568 for females. The per capita income for the county was $24,726. About 10.3% of families and 15.7% of the population were below the poverty line, including 26.1% of those under age 18 and 6.5% of those age 65 or over.

Communities

Cities 

 Decatur (county seat and largest municipality)
 Macon
 Maroa

Villages

 Argenta
 Blue Mound
 Forsyth
 Harristown
 Long Creek
 Mount Zion
 Niantic
 Oreana
 Warrensburg

Census-designated place
 Boody

Unincorporated communities

 Bearsdale
 Blackland
 Bulldog Crossing
 Casner
 Elwin
 Emery
 Heman
 Hervey City
 Newburg
 Oakley
 Prairie Hall
 Sangamon
 Walker

Townships

 Austin
 Blue Mound
 Decatur
 Friends Creek
 Harristown
 Hickory Point
 Illini
 Long Creek
 Maroa
 Milam (former, now defunct, after merger with Mount Zion Township)
 Mount Zion
 Niantic
 Oakley
 Pleasant View
 South Macon
 South Wheatland
 Whitmore

Politics
In its early years Macon County favored the Democratic Party, voting for it in every election through 1860. Republican Abraham Lincoln won the county in the 1864 election, and from then until the Great Depression Macon County became solidly Republican, only giving a narrow plurality to Woodrow Wilson in 1912 when the GOP was mortally divided by Theodore Roosevelt's splinter–party run.

The FDR-era New Deal saw the county become more amenable to the Democratic Party again due to its strong industrial base. Macon County voted for the winner in every election from 1920 through 1996 save in 1960, 1968, and 1988, in two of which it voted for a losing Democrat over a winning Republican (Humphrey over Nixon in 1968 and Dukakis over George H. W. Bush in 1988). In 2000, Macon voted for a losing Democrat for the third time since the New Deal, as Al Gore narrowly held the county, but since then the county has once again trended Republican, as George W. Bush carried the county over John Kerry in 2004 with the same vote share as Reagan in his 1984 national landslide. Illinois native Barack Obama did carry the county with a plurality in his sweeping 2008 triumph, but was convincingly defeated by Mitt Romney in the county in 2012. In 2016, Hillary Clinton got the lowest vote share of any Democrat since George McGovern; and while Joe Biden improved on her vote share in 2020, he still failed to match McGovern's percentage.

See also
 National Register of Historic Places listings in Macon County, Illinois

Notes

References

 
Illinois counties
1829 establishments in Illinois
Populated places established in 1829